MRDS may refer to:
 Microsoft Robotics Developer Studio
 a Member of the Royal Dublin Society
 Monster Rancher DS